Xanthorhoini is a tribe of geometer moths under subfamily Larentiinae. The tribe was described by Pierce in 1914.

Recognized genera

References

External links
 

 
Larentiinae